Adia is a Swahili name meaning "gift".

People
Adia Chan Indonesian-born Hong Kong actress, singer, model
A'dia Mathies (born 1991), American professional basketball player
Adia Barnes (born 1977), American women's basketball coach
Adia (musician), stage name of Destiny Adia Andrews

See also 

 Adia, 1998 single by Sarah McLachlan

References
2. The international dating book, page 34

Feminine given names